Guiping is a county-level city in eastern Guangxi, China. It is under the administration of Guigang City, located at the confluence of the Qian and Yu rivers, which are the Xi River's primary north and south tributaries, respectively.

Names
Guiping was formerly known as Xunzhou. From 1855 to 1861 it was the capital of the rebel state of Da Cheng and was called Xiujing.

Geography and climate 

Guiping has a monsoon-influenced humid subtropical climate (Köppen Cfa), with short, mild winters, and long, hot, humid summers. Winter begins dry but becomes progressively wetter and cloudier. Spring is generally overcast and often rainy, while summer continues to be rainy though it is the sunniest time of year. Autumn is sunny and dry. With monthly percent possible sunshine ranging from 13% in March to 53% in September, the city receives 1,596 hours of bright sunshine annually.

Administrative divisions 
Guiping administers 21 towns and 5 townships:

Towns:

 Mule (Chinese: 木乐镇)
 Mugui (木圭镇)
 Shizui (石嘴镇)
 Youma (油麻镇)
 Shepo (社坡镇)
 Luoxiu (罗秀镇)
 Madong (麻垌镇)
 Shebu (社步镇)
 Xiawan (下湾镇)
 Mugen (木根镇)
 Zhongsha (中沙镇)
 Dayang (大洋镇)
 Dawan (大湾镇)
 Baisha (白沙镇)
 Shilong (石龙镇)
 Mengxu (蒙圩镇)
 Nanmu (南木镇)
 Jiangkou (江口镇)
 Jintian (金田镇)
 Zijing (紫荆镇)
 Xishan (西山镇)

Townships:

 Mapi Township (Chinese: 马皮乡)
 Xunwang Township (寻旺乡)
 Luobo Township (罗播乡)
 Houlu Township (厚禄乡)
 Dongxin Township (垌心乡)

See also 
 Jintian Uprising

References

External links 
  
 Website of the Jintian Uprising
 Xinhua website 

 
County-level divisions of Guangxi
Cities in Guangxi
Guigang